The Michael Nyman Band, formerly known as the Campiello Band, is a group formed as a street band for a 1976 production of Carlo Goldoni's 1756 play, Il Campiello directed by Bill Bryden at the Old Vic. The band did not wish to break up after the production ended, so its director, Michael Nyman, began composing music for the group to perform, beginning with "In Re Don Giovanni", written in 1977. Originally made up of old instruments such as rebecs, sackbuts and shawms alongside more modern instruments like the banjo and saxophone to produce as loud a sound as possible without amplification, it later switched to a fully amplified line-up of string quartet, double bass, clarinet, three saxophones, horn, trumpet, bass trombone, bass guitar, and piano. This lineup has been variously altered and augmented for some works.

History
The band's first recorded album on a professional label was Nyman's second, the self-titled Michael Nyman (1981), which mostly comprised pieces written for the early films of Peter Greenaway. This album was not released on compact disc until 2012. Another self-titled album (1995) has appeared as a promotional item compiling tracks from various other albums, and should not be confused with this one.

Along with soundtracks to Greenaway's The Draughtsman's Contract, Drowning by Numbers, and The Cook The Thief His Wife & Her Lover, their 1980s output included The Kiss and Other Movements (which includes the titular art song; a song from Nyman's projected Tristram Shandy opera; a tango; a movement from the same work as "Memorial" as used in Greenaway's 26 Bathrooms; and a performance of music (not the original soundtrack) from Greenaway's Making a Splash) and the modern dance work And Do They Do. They also made a limited edition recording of Nyman's La Traversée de Paris in 1989; many of its individual movements were soon to be dismantled, revised, or simply transplanted whole, to serve as the soundtrack for Greenaway's Prospero's Books (1991). Conversely, Nyman composed music for another adaptation of William Shakespeare's The Tempest, the ballet-opera Noises, Sounds & Sweet Airs, soon after Prospero's Books, some of which was derived from La Traversée de Paris.

Their 1992 album, The Essential Michael Nyman Band, may appear to be a greatest hits compilation, but is actually composed of the concert versions of various film pieces, having undergone years of revisions and refinement, are significantly different from their soundtrack counterparts, to a far more severe extent than typical differences between classical music performances. This album also contains two cuts from the film score to A Zed & Two Noughts, which was originally performed by an orchestra of musicians who were never members of the band, with solos by band members Nyman, Balanescu, Perry, and Leonard. Similarly, The Piano was performed by members of the Munich Philharmonic Orchestra with Harle, Roach, Findon, and Nyman, but is also part of the band's repertoire.

In 1993, the band joined with an orchestra for the first time in their recording history with MGV: Musique à Grand Vitesse, a piece commissioned for the opening of a TGV line, first performed on 26 September 1993, in which the band, according to Nyman's own liner notes, represents the tracks, "resisting the temptation of the concerto grosso". The album credit is to "The Michael Nyman Band and Orchestra".

Associated acts
The group has largely been superseded by the Michael Nyman Orchestra. Such soundtrack albums as Practical Magic, Ravenous, The End of the Affair, The Claim, and The Libertine are credited to this group, first implied on that 1994 album. While the former two titles lack detailed credits, the latter three albums show that most of the band (not to say most of those credited as full members over its history) performs in the Orchestra. The band's existence is far from over, however, as Nyman orchestrated his 2002 opera, Facing Goya, specifically for the band. His previous two opera recordings include band members but are not formally credited to the band, and one, the aforementioned Noises, Sounds & Sweet Airs, uses a full-scale orchestra, without Nyman at the baton. Man and Boy: Dada (2004) and Love Counts (2005; recorded 2007), Nyman's newest operas, feature the band conducted by Paul McGrath.

In 1996, another offshoot group, The Nyman Quartet, consisting of Cathy Thompson, Gabrielle Lester, Kate Musker, and Tony Hinnigan, recorded The Ballad of Kastriot Rexhepi (with Sarah Leonard--the only singer ever credited as a band member) and Exit No Exit, and plan to record the third recording of Nyman's four string quartets.

They are produced by David Cunningham.

Many of the current and former band members, including John Harle, Alexander Balanescu, Dave Lee, Madeleine Mitchell, Andrew Findon, and Simon Haram, have released solo albums that include performances of Nyman's music.

Lineup
The membership in the band is rather fluid, though it has had many core members. Often, whoever plays with the band on a given album is credited as a full member, though just as often, non-members are credited as guest artists. The following people have received credit as full-fledged members on at least one album, followed by a list of every instrument that they have been credited with playing at any time. The recordings prior to Michael Nyman (1981) did not credit individual band members.

(Listed chronologically)

Michael Nyman (1976–), composer, conductor, piano, harpsichord, kurzweil
Rory Allam (1981), clarinet
Alexander Bălănescu (1981–1993, 1999–2002), violin
Anne Barnard (1981), french horn
Ben Grove (1981), bass guitar
John Harle (1981–1999), soprano saxophone, alto saxophone, tenor saxophone
Nick Hayley (1981), rebec, violin
Ian Mitchell (1981–1982), clarinet, bass clarinet, alto saxophone
Elisabeth Perry (1981–1991, 1998), violin, viola
Steve Saunders (1981–1991), bass trombone, euphonium
Roderick Skeaping (1981), rebec, violin
Keith Thompson (1981–1982), flute, piccolo, recorder, tenor saxophone
Doug Wootton (1981), banjo
Malcolm Bennett (1982), bass guitar
Andrew Findon (1980–), tenor saxophone, baritone saxophone, piccolo, flute, bass flute, alto flute
Barry Guy (1982), double bass
David Fuest (1985, 1986, 1989, 2007), clarinet, bass clarinet
John Greaves (1985), bass guitar
David Roach (1985–), soprano, alto and tenor saxophones
Sarah Leonard (1985–1991), soprano
Rupert Bawden (1986), viola
Ruth Phillips (1986, 1991), cello
Jonathan "John" Carney (1987–1991), violin, viola
Catherine "Kate" Musker (1987–), viola
Anthony "Tony" Hinnigan (1987–), cello
Miranda Fulleylove, also spelled "Fullylove" (1988, 1999), violin
Rosemary Furniss (1988), violin
Briony Shaw (1988), violin
Jackie Shave (1988, 1989, 1999), violin
Joe Rappaport (1988), viola
Andrew Shulman (1988), cello
Robin McGee (1988–1989), double bass
John Wilbraham (1988), trumpet, flugelhorn
Michael Thompson (1988), french horn
Christopher "Chris" Laurence also spelled "Lawrence" (1989, 1994, 1999, 2006–), double bass
Graham Ashton (1989–1992), trumpet, flugelhorn
David Stewart (also spelled "Stuart") (1989), trombone
Clare Connors (1989–1994), violin
Justin Pearson (1989–1992, 2005), cello
Paul Morgan (1989, 1991, 1999, 2004), double bass
David Rix (1989, 1991–1999, 2004), clarinet, bass clarinet
Jamie Talbot (1989, 1991, 1995, 2005), soprano and alto saxophones
Simon Haram (1989, 1996–), soprano and alto saxophones
Richard Clews (1989, 1991, 1995–1996), french horn, Wagner tuba
Huw Jenkins (1989), horn
Fenella Barton (1989), violin
Gabrielle "Gaby" Lester (1989, 2002–), violin
Iris Juda (1989), violin
Jonathan Rees (1989, 1999), violin
Lyn Fletcher, violin
Mayumi Seiler, violin
Michael "Mike" McMenemy (1989, 1991, 1992, 1994), violin
Richard Ehrlich, violin
Roger Tapping, viola
Jane Salmen, cello
Tim Hugh, cello
Lynda Herighten, double bass
Martin Elliott (1989, 1991–1995, (live only 1996–1998) 1999–), bass guitar
Richard Watkins (1989), horn
Tim Amhurst also spelled "Amherst" (1991, 1994), double bass
Lynda Houghton (1991), double bass
Marjorie Dunn (1991–1994), horn
Nigel Barr (1991–), bass trombone, euphonium, tuba
Madeleine Mitchell (1992), violin
Beverley "Bev" Davison (1992, 1994, 1995, 1999, 2005), violin official site
Ann Morfee (also spelled Morphy) (1992–1994, 1999, 2002), violin
Steven "Steve" Sidwell (1992–), trumpet, flugelhorn, piccolo trumpet
Jonathan Lenahan (1992), piano
Marshall Marcus (1994), violin
Katherine "Kathy" Shave (1994, 1999–2002), violin
William Schofield (1994, 2007), cello
William "Bill" Hawkes (1994, 1996, 1999), violin
Claire Thompson (1995), violin
Nicholas Ward (1995), violin
Boguslav Kosteci/Boguslow Kosteki (1995), violin
Harriet Davies (1995), violin
Bruce White (1995, 1999–), viola
Philip D'Arcy (1995, 1999), viola
Jim Sleigh (1995), viola
Tony Lewis (1995), cello
David Lee (1996–), french horn, Wagner tuba
Nigel Gomm (1996, 1998, 2002, 2007–), trumpet, flugelhorn
Nigel Black, (1996) french horn, Wagner tuba
Paul Gargham, (1996) french horn, Wagner tuba
Chris Davies (1996), french horn, Wagner tuba
Gary Kettel (1996), drums
Rachel Browne (1998), violin
Prunella Pacey (1998), violin
Melissa Phelps (1998), cello
Andrew Fawbert (1998, 2002), bass trombone, tuba, euphonium
Sophie Landon (1999), violin
Fran Andrade (1999), violin
Jonathan Evans-Jones (1999, 2007), violin
Andrew Parker (1999), viola
Sophie Harris (1999), cello
Ian Humphries, violin (2002, 2005, 2007–)
Elizabeth Burley (2002)
Catherine "Cathy" Thompson (2002–) violin
Gillian Findlay (2002), violin
Roger Linley (2002), double bass
Stephen Williams (2002), double bass
James Woodrow (2002), electric guitar
Edward Coxon, violin (2003)
Richard Cookson, viola (2003)
Nicholas "Nick" Cooper, cello (2003, 2005)
Mary Scully, double bass (2003, 2006)
Rebecca Hirsch, violin (2004–2005)
Melinda Maxwell, oboe (2004)
Gareth Hulse, oboe (2004)
Andrew Sparling, clarinet, bass clarinet (2004, 2005, 2007)
Christopher Gunia, bassoon (2004)
Richard Benjafield, percussion (2004)
Dominic Saunders, piano (2004, 2006)
Ian Humphries, violin (2005)
Mia Cooper, violin (2005)
Lizzie Bull, violin (2005)
Morvent Bruce, violin (2005)
James Boyd, viola (2005)
John Metcalfe, viola (2005)
Robert Max, cello (2005)
Fiona McNaught, violin (2005, 2007)
Robert Buckland, soprano and alto sax (2005)
David Arch, piano (2005)
Phillipa Ibbotson, violin (2006)
Nicolette Kuo, violin (2006)
Emlyn Singleton, violin (2006)
Debbie Widdup, violin (2006)
Harriet Davies, violin (2006)
Fenella Barton, violin (2006)
Nick Barr, viola (2006)
Jonathan Barritt, viola (2006)
Allen Walley, bass (2006)
Walter Fabeck, keyboards (2006)
Simon Chamberlain, piano (2006)

Discography

Not Necessarily English Music, a collection of experimental music from Great Britain, 1960–1977, curated by David Toop
Miserere by Giuseppe Verdi, arranged by M. Nyman
The Campiello Band: Michael Nyman, Rory Allam, Lucie Skeaping, Roddie Skeaping, Steve Saunders, Keith Thompson, Doug Wooton
Recorded in Clifton College, Nottingham, England, 3 March 1977. Recorded by Robert Worby.
"The Masterwork" Award Winning Fish-Knife (1979)
no musician credits
From Brussels with Love (1980) – "A Walk Through H, Part 1"
Miniatures (1980) – "89–90–91–92"
Michael Nyman (1981)
Allam, Balanescu, Barnard, Grove, Harle, Hayley, I. Mitchell, Nyman, Perry, S. Saunders, Skeaping, K. Thompson, Wootton, with Peter Brötzmann (bass clarinet, tenor saxophone), Evan Parker, (soprano saxophone), Lucy Skeaping (soprano)
The Draughtsman's Contract (1982)
Nyman, Balanescu, Bennett, Findon, Guy, Harle, I. Mitchell, Perry, S. Saunders, K. Thompson
The Kiss and Other Movements (1985)
Balanescu, Findon, Fuest, Greaves, Harle, Nyman, Perry, Roach, S. Saunders; with Dagmar Krause, Omar Ebrahim, Sarah Leonard (vocals), Mark Bennett (trumpet), Lowri Blake (cello), Martin Drower (trumpet), Rosemary Furniss (violin), David Purser (trombone), David Staff (trumpet), Crispian Steele-Perkins (trumpet), Theresa Ward (violin), Nigel Warren-Green (cello), Jonathan Williams (cello)
And Do They Do (1986)
Balanescu, Bawden, Findon, Fuest, Nyman, Perry, Phillips, Roach
Drowning by Numbers (1988)
Balanescu, Carney, Fulleylove, Furniss, Shaw, J. Shave, Musker, Carney, Rappaport, Hinningan, Shulman, McGee, Fuest, Harle, Roach, Findon, Wilbraham, M. Thompson, S. Saunders, Nyman
La Traversée de Paris (1989)
Balanescu, Perry, Connors, Carney, Hinnigan, Pearson, Morgan, McGee, Rix, Fuest, Harle, Talbot, Haram, Findon, Ashton, Clews, Jenkins, S. Saunders, with Sarah Leonard, and London Voices directed by Terry Edwards
The Cook The Thief His Wife & Her Lover (1989)
Balanescu, Perry, Carney, Hinnigan, Lawrence, Fuest, Harle, Roach, Findon, Ashton, Stewart, Nyman, Leonard, with London Voices directed by Terry Edwards (Paul Chapman (boy soprano), Elisabeth Harrison, Judith Rees, Sue Anderson, Sarah Leonard, Lesley Reid, Doreen Walker, Gareth Roberts, Terry Edwards, Simon Davies, Gordon Jones, Geoffrey Shaw)
La Sept
Nyman, Perry, Barton, Lester, Juda, J. Shave, Rees, Fletcher, Seiler, McMeneny, Ehrlich, Musker, Tapping, Salmen, Hugh, Hinnigan, Herighten, Elliott, Rix, Harle, Roach, Findon, Stuart, Watkins, with Sylvie Caspar
Le Mari de la Coiffeuse (The Hairdresser's Husband) (1990)
no musician credits
Prospero's Books (1991)
Balanescu, Carney, Perry, Connors, Musker, Hinnigan, Pearson, Morgan, Amhurst, Houghton, Elliott, Rix, Harle, Roach, Talbot, Findon, Ashton, Clews, Dunn, Barr, S. Saunders, Nyman, with Sarah Leonard, Marie Angel, Ute Lemper, Deborah Conway
The Michael Nyman Songbook sung by Ute Lemper (1991)
Balanescu, Perry, Connors, McMenemy, Musker, Hinnigan, Phillips, Amherst, Elliott, Rix, Harle, Roach, Findon, Ashton, Dunn, Barr, Nyman (note: The line-up in Volker Schlöndorff's concert film of the same title (1992) is different from the studio album:  Nyman, Davison, M. Mitchell, Morfee, Musker, Hinnigan, Pearson, Elliott, Rix, Harle, Roach, Findon, Sidwell, Dunn, Barr)
The Essential Michael Nyman Band (1992)
Balanescu, Connors, Morphy, Musker, Hinnigan, Pearson, Elliott, Harle, Roach, Findon, Sidwell, Dunn, Barr, Lenahan, Nyman, with Sarah Leonard (soprano), Linda Hirst (mezzo-soprano)
Ai Confini: Interzone (1993) – The Final Score, Part I (complete recording released on After Extra Time in 1996)
Nyman, Balanescu, Connors, Morfee, Musker, Hinnigan, Pearson, Elliott, Harle, Roach, Findon, Sidwell
MGV (Musique à Grande Vitesse) (1994)
Nyman, Balanescu, Connors, Hinnigan, Harle, Roach, Findon, Barr, Elliott, with Orchestra
Anohito no Waltz (1994)
Nyman, Balanescu, Connors, Musker, Hinnigan, Harle, Roach, Findon, Barr, Elliott, with Hihiri Kuwano (violin), Tatsunobu Getoh (violin), Hiroshi Yamagishi (French horn), Akihiko Ikawa (trumpet)
À la folie (Six Days, Six Nights) (1994)
Davison, Morfee, Marcus, K. Shave, Musker, Hinningan, Scofield, Laurence, Amhurst, Harle, Roach, Findon, Barr, Sidwell, Dunn, Elliott, Nyman
Live (1994)
Nyman, Carney, Hawkes, Musker, Hinnigan, Harle, Roach, Findon, Barr, Elliott with Guergui Stoianov Boiadjev (violin), Nanko Mikov Dimitrov (violin), Evelina Nedeva Arabadjieva (violin), Kantcho Stefanov Kantchev (violin), Nediltcho Suilianov Hristov (viola), Stefan Todorov Jilkov (viola), Marieta Mihaylova Ivanova (cello), Emilia Hrostova Radilova (cello); musicians from Orquestra Andaluzi de Tetouan: Abdessadak Ckara (violin), Abdella Chekara (Laúd), Jelloul Najidi (kanoun), Ahmed Taoud (violin), Driss Aaufi (saxophone), Ahmet Mrabet (clarinet), Abdesslam Beniisa (cello), Mohamed Acgaalh (banderita (tambourine)), Jalla Chekara (violin), Nour-Din Aghbal (violin), Abdelouahid El Bazi (derboliga (drum)), Mohammed Chkara (cello)
Carrington (1995)
Nyman, Davison, Morfee, Claire Thompson, Ward, Kosteki, H. Davies, Musker, White, D'Arcy, Sleigh, Hinnigan, Pearson, Lewis, Elliott, Roach, Talbot, Clews
The Diary of Anne Frank (1995)
with Hilary Summers, contralto
After Extra Time (1996)
Nyman, Hawkes, Morfee, Musker, Hinnigan, Harle, Roach, Findon, Barr, Sidwell, Lee, Elliott (b/w The Final Score (1993); and "Memorial" as recorded on The Essential Michael Nyman Band in 1992)
The Ogre (1996)
Harle, Roach, Haram, Findon, Sidwell, Gomm, Lee, Black, Gargham, Clews, C. Davies, Barr, Kettel, Nyman, edited by Elliott
The Suit and the Photograph (1998) – "3 Quartets"
Perry, Browne, Phelps, Harle, Roach, Haram, Findon, Gomm, Lee, Fawbert, Nyman
Twentieth-Century Blues: The Songs of Noel Coward (1998)
"London Pride" arranged by Damon Albarn and Michael Nyman
No individual musician credits
Wonderland (1999)
J. Shave, Davison, Rees, K. Shave, Landon, Andrade, Fullylove, Evans-Jones, Hawkes, Parker, Musker, Hinnigan, Harris, Morgan, Roach, Haram, Findon, Elliott, Lee, Sidwell, Barr, Nyman
String Quartets 2, 3 & 4/If & Why (2002)
Haram, White, Humphries, Hinnigan, Morfee, Burley
Facing Goya (2002)
Balanescu, Lester, Catherine Thompson, Findlay, K. Shave, Musker, White, Hinnigan, Linley, Williams, Elliott, Roach, Haram, Findon, Sidwell, Gomm, Lee, Barr, Fawbert, Woodrow, Nyman, with Winnie Böwe (soprano), Marie Angel (soprano), Hilary Summers (contralto), Harry Nicoll (tenor), Omar Ebrahim (baritone)
Sangam: Michael Nyman Meets Indian Masters (2003)
 Lester, Catherine Thompson, Coxon, Musker, Cookson, Hinnigan, N. Cooper, Scully, Elliott, Roach, Haram, Findon, Sidwell, Lee, Barr, Nyman, with U. Shrinivas (mandolin), Rajan Misra, Sajan Misra, Ritesh Misra, Rajnish Misra (vocals), Sanju Sahai (tabla)
The Actors (2003)
Man and Boy: Dada (2004)
Lester, Hirsch, Hinnigan, Morgan, Maxwell, Hulse, Sparling, Rix, Roach, Gunia, Benjafield, S. Saunders
The Composer's Cut Series Vol. I: The Draughtsman's Contract  (2006)
Nyman, Lester, Cathy Thompson, Musker, Hinnigan, Roach, Haram, Findon, Elliott, Lee, Sidwell, Barr, Humphries, Davison, M. Cooper, Bull
The Composer's Cut Series Vol. II: Nyman/Greenaway Revisited (2006)
Nyman, Lester, Cathy Thompson, Musker, Hinnigan, Roach, Haram, Findon, Elliott, Lee, Sidwell, Gomm, Barr, Humphries, Davison
The Composer's Cut Series Vol. III: The Piano (2006)
Nyman, Lester, Catherine Thompson, Humphries, Davison, M. Cooper, Hirsch, Bull, Bruce, Musker, Boyd, Metcalfe, Hinnigan, Max, Pearson, Elliott, Roach, Haram, Findon, Barr
Six Celan Songs (2006)
Nyman, Lester, Catherine Thompson, McNaught, Musker, Hinnigan, N. Cooper, Laurence, Elliott, Roach, Haram, Buckland, Findo[n], Sparling, Sidwell, Barr, Arch, with Hilary Summers
Love Counts (2007)
Humphries, Ibbotson, Kuo, Evans-Jones, Singleton, Widdup, Davies, Barton, Musker, Nick Barr, Barritt, Hinnigan, Schofield, Laurence, Scully, Walley, Elliott, D. Saunders, Fabeck, Fuest, Sparling, Findon, Lee, Sidwell, Gomm, conducted by Paul McGrath, with Helen Davies and Andrew Slater
Mozart 252 (2008)
Nyman, Chamberlain, Humphries, Lester, McNaught, Catherine Thompson, Musker, Hinnigan, Elliott, Roach, Haram, Findon, Gomm, Sidwell, Lee, Barr, with Hilary Summers, Andrew Slater
8 Lust Songs: I Sonetti Lussuriosi (2008)
Lester, Cathy Thompson, Musker, Hinnigan, Elliott, Roach, Haram, Findon, Sidwell, Lee, Barr, Nyman, with Marie Angel

References

Musical groups established in 1976
1976 establishments in England
Michael Nyman
Contemporary classical music ensembles